Anton Stephanus Barnard  (born 7 April 1958) is a former South African rugby union player.

Playing career

Barnard played for  Eastern Province in the South African provincial competitions and for the Springboks. He made his test debut against the visiting South American Jaguars team on 20 October 1984 at Loftus Versveld in Pretoria.

Test history

See also
List of South Africa national rugby union players – Springbok no. 538

References

1958 births
Living people
South African rugby union players
South Africa international rugby union players
People from George, South Africa
Rugby union players from the Western Cape
Rugby union props
Eastern Province Elephants players